Tubocapsicum is a genus of flowering plants belonging to the family Solanaceae.

Its native range is Tropical Asia and Temperate Asia.

Species:
 Tubocapsicum anomalum (Franch. & Sav.) Makino 
 Tubocapsicum boninense (Koidz.) Koidz. ex H.Hara

References

Physaleae
Solanaceae genera